Pelargonium zonate spot virus (PZSV) is a plant pathogenic virus, classified in the Bromoviridae family, genus Anulavirus.

References

External links
 ICTVdB - The Universal Virus Database: Pelargonium zonate spot virus
 Family Groups - The Baltimore Method

Bromoviridae
Viral plant pathogens and diseases